Enforcer is the name of two fictional characters appearing in American comic books published by Marvel Comics.

Publication history
The first Enforcer first appeared in Ghost Rider #22-24 (February–June 1977), and was created by Gerry Conway, Don Glut, and Don Heck. The character subsequently appeared in Spider-Woman #19 (October 1979), #27-29 (June–August 1980), Ghost Rider #58 (July 1981), and Spider-Woman #50 (June 1983). He was killed by the Scourge of the Underworld in Iron Man #194 (May 1985). The Enforcer received an entry in the Official Handbook of the Marvel Universe Deluxe Edition #17.

Fictional character biography

Charles L. Delazny, Jr.

Charles L. Delazny, Jr. was born in San Jose, California. He is a criminal mercenary and son of Charles L. Delazny Sr. who owned Delazny studios. Beginning a criminal career, he employs an elderly scientist named Dr. Ignatz Goldman, who designs Charles' costume. Charles then takes on the costumed identity of the Enforcer.

To obtain a disintegrator ray generator, Enforcer hires Gladiator to steal if from Eel, who was in possession of the device. Enforcer encounters Eel in the alley and claims the device as Gladiator kills Eel. Enforcer brings the device to Dr. Goldman to be miniaturized.

Dr. Goldman presents the disintegrator ray device in the form of a medallion. Enforcer arrives at the Belaire mansion to confront the "boss" of the criminal organization that gained control of Delazny studios. He then announces that he is taking over the organization. When the boss of the criminal organization threatens the Enforcer, he is disintegrated. The boss' henchmen then swear allegiance to Enforcer. Dr. Goldman then miniaturizes it further into a ring. As Enforcer and his henchmen head to San Diego Naval Yards, they are followed by Ghost Rider. During Enforcer's fight with the shore patrol, he is attacked by Ghost Rider. The two battle until they both fall into the water. Enforcer escapes, but his ring falls off into the water during the fight.

Enforcer approaches Water Wizard and offers him a million dollars if he can eliminate Ghost Rider. Water Wizard uses his powers to create 1,000 liquid beings to help recover Enforcer's ring from the bottom of San Diego Harbor. Enforcer later has Water Wizard ambush Ghost Rider, which ends with Ghost Rider being knocked out and turning back into Johnny Blaze. Enforcer has the unconscious Johnny Blaze strapped to a motorcycle and sent off the cliff. Johnny regains consciousness and turns into Ghost Rider as the motorcycle goes off the cliff. Returning to his underwater base with Water Wizard, Enforcer reveals that he planned to use Delazny's money to build a criminal empire. Enforcer then decides that Dr. Goldman has served his purpose. As he is about to disintegrate Dr. Goldman, Ghost Rider shows up and defeats Enforcer and Water Wizard. Ghost Rider contacts the authorities and tells them where to find the villains.

Enforcer manages to recover before the authorities arrive. In his civilian form, Enforcer convinces the authorities that Carson Collier Jr. was the Enforcer, causing Carson to be arrested for Enforcer's crimes. Charles Delazny Sr. soon figures out that his own son is the Enforcer.

While gathering info on Ghost Rider, Doctor Druid visits Charles Delazny Jr. and uses his powers to probe his mind. He learns that his son is the Enforcer.

The Committee later hires Enforcer and gives him a modified automated pistol to replace his disintegrator ring. His first assignment is to "silence" writer Buck Cowan (who was about to expose the Committee's activities to the cops). Enforcer kills Buck Cowan's former employer.

The Committee informs Enforcer that Buck Cowan's friend is Jack Russell and the fact that Jack is also Werewolf by Night. Enforcer confronts Cowan at Russell's apartment. Russel transforms, but is unable to stop the Enforcer from using his "tingler" (a device which attaches to the victim's spine and causes him to ignite into flames if he tries to tell anyone about the Enforcer) on Cowan. The fight draws the attention of Spider-Woman, who defeats the Enforcer and leaves him for the police.

While in custody, Enforcer attempts to confuse the police by claiming that he is Carson Collier Jr. His deception is not exposed until he makes his escape.

While "Carson Collier" is serving time in California State Prison, he receives a private visit from newspaper tycoon Rupert M. Dockery. Dockery contrives to leave behind a cane with a hidden blade, allowing the Enforcer and four other inmates to overpower the guards and make their escape. Enforcer then plans revenge against Spider-Woman. He steals the only bronze representation of Anasi the Spider from the Los Angeles Museum of Anthropology and Folk Art in order to lure Spider-Woman to him, then defeats and captures her. When her criminologist partner Scotty McDowall tries to rescue her, the Enforcer shoots him with a psycho-chemical incendiary dart.

Enforcer offers to give Spider-Woman the antidote if she helps him steal $10,000,000, enough for him to retire from his super-villain career. He strings her along for some weeks, during which the two of them work together to pull off three major heists. He then reveals to her that he never had any antidote for his darts, and gloats over the fact that she has made herself as much a wanted criminal as him for nothing. To complete his revenge, he voluntarily turns himself over to the police, thus depriving Spider-Woman of even the satisfaction of apprehending him.

The Enforcer is soon at large again. The police are undetermined if Enforcer is actually Carson Collier yet.

Enforcer is later hired by some gamblers to fix the rematch between Johnny Blaze and Flagg Fargo. Enforcer meets with Flagg Fargo and threatens to kill him if he doesn't take a dive. During the racing, Enforcer shoots Flagg Fargo, causing him to crash into some cars. While everyone is distracted, Enforcer goes to the stadium box office and robs it of $300,000 of ticket receipts. Enforcer shoots two guards with his tranquilizer darts and escapes in his souped-up car. He is pursued by Ghost Rider. Enforcer fires a missile from his car's bomb bay to destroy the bridge and cut off Ghost Rider's pursuit, but Ghost Rider takes the long way around. Finding himself racing against Ghost Rider on a narrow road high above the lake, Enforcer drives his car off the precipice and into the lake. By the time he emerges from the lake, Ghost Rider is gone.

Enforcer is among several superbeings from Los Angeles who are captured by Locksmith and confined in his private prison. When several of Locksmith's non-criminal captives break free, they have the Enforcer turned over to the authorities.

Enforcer is later hired by Madame Masque (on behalf of Obadiah Stane) to kill a criminal called Termite. The Enforcer is shot and killed by the Scourge of the Underworld disguised as a bag lady. Madame Masque later informs Obadiah on what happened to the Enforcer.

When Captain America catches the Scourge of the Underworld, he claims that he is Enforcer's younger brother and that he killed him in retaliation for the shame Enforcer brought upon his family. He also states that Enforcer caused the heartbreak their father felt on learning Enforcer's true identity.

Mike Nero
A new Enforcer is one of a collection of supervillains featured in Frank Tieri's project for Marvel Dark Reign: Made Men. This Enforcer is Mike Nero, the nephew of the original Enforcer. Following the death of his uncle, Mike Nero became the new Enforcer and learned how to deal with supernatural threats where he started to develop a reputation by killing werewolves, zombies, a vampire, and a Maggia crime lord. Enforcer then stole an Aztec exhibit from a museum. He was then apprehended by the Wrecking Crew who hauled him to the Hood (who also sought out the money he owed to a loan shark named Nicky Bats). The Wrecking Crew surrounded Enforcer in one of Hood's hideouts as Hood inspected Enforcer's stash of mystical artifacts and offered Enforcer a role in his criminal organization as its supernatural expert. Enforcer triggered an amulet disguising a creature that fed off demonic energies, which then clasped onto Hood's face. Enforcer used his magic bullets on the Wrecking Crew and escapes through a glass window, declaring that he was just getting started. After Enforcer's escape, Hood swore his revenge on Enforcer.

Powers and equipment
The first Enforcer wore body armor with a silver-nitrate covered vest for protection from werewolves. He carried two .45 caliber guns with which he used normal ammunition, silver bullets, tranquilizer pellets, pyrogranulate capsules, and a "tingler" that changes the victim's metabolism, causing the victim to burst into flame by post-hypnotic command. He also wore a disintegrator amulet, later in the form of a ring.

References

External links
 
 

Characters created by Don Heck
Characters created by Gerry Conway
Comics characters introduced in 1977
Fictional characters from San Francisco Bay Area
Marvel Comics supervillains